A.S.M. Sulaiman was a Member of the 4th National Assembly of Pakistan as a representative of East Pakistan.

Career
Sulaiman was a Member of the  4th National Assembly of Pakistan representing Dacca-VI. In 1969, he served as the President of Krishak Sramik Party.

References

Pakistani MNAs 1965–1969
Living people
Year of birth missing (living people)